Muschampia tessellum, the tessellated skipper, is a butterfly of the  family Hesperiidae. It is found from the southern Balkan Peninsula (Macedonia, Bulgaria, Greece and the European part of Turkey) through Ukraine, southern Russia (north to the Moscow region) and Asia Minor, southern Siberia, Mongolia, east to the Amur region.

The length of the forewings is 13–16 mm, the wingspan is 32–36 mm. The upper wings are brown with numerous clear white spots on both fore- and hindwings. The underside of the wings are olive green with paler spots. Adults are on wing from the end of May to mid-August in Europe. In the Altai Mountains, adults are on wing from May to July.

The larvae feed on Phlomis species, including Phlomis samia in Greece and Phlomis tuberosa in the southern Ural.

Subspecies
Muschampia tessellum tessellum
Muschampia tessellum cribrelloides
Muschampia tessellum nigricans
Muschampia tessellum dilutior

References
Whalley, Paul - Mitchell Beazley Guide to Butterflies (1981, reprinted 1992)

External links
 Captain's European Butterfly Guide
 Moths and Butterflies of Europe and North Africa
 Schmetterlinge und ihre Ökologie
 Butterfly Conservation Armenia

Muschampia
Butterflies of Europe
Butterflies described in 1803
Butterflies of Asia
Taxa named by Jacob Hübner